The Battle of Adal took place on 1 September 1961, and was the first battle in the Eritrean War of Independence. In the battle, the Eritrean Liberation Front, which numbered at only 14, was able to overcome the local Ethiopian forces. Rebel weaponry included 1 British and 3 old Italian guns, while the majority of Rebels were unarmed. The battle begun at 9:00 AM, and lasted about six hours, and is commemorated in Eritrea as Revolution Day. 
  
The rebels who participated were:  

 Hamid Idris Awate (ELF leader)  
 Abdu M. Fayd
 Ibrahim  M. Ali
 Humed Qadif
 Awate M. Fayd
 Mohammed Bayraq (taken prisoner, later died in 1975 in an Ethiopian prison)
 Mohammed Adem Hisan
 Saleh Qaruj
 Ahmed Fikak
 Mohammed Hassen Duhe
 Adem Faqurai
 Ali Bakhit
 Idris Mohamoud
 Omar Karay

References

  

1961 in Eritrea
1961 in Ethiopia
Eritrean War of Independence
Battles involving Ethiopia
Battles involving Eritrea